Peleopoda is a moth genus of the family Depressariidae.

Species
 Peleopoda irenella  Busck
 Peleopoda lobitarsis Zeller, 1877
 Peleopoda marioniella  Busck
 Peleopoda navigatrix (Meyrick, 1912)
 Peleopoda notandella  Busck
 Peleopoda spudasma (Walsingham, 1912)
 Peleopoda semocrossa Meyrick, 1930
 Peleopoda convoluta Duckworth, 1970

References

 
Peleopodinae